New Orleans Uncensored is a 1955 American film noir crime film directed by William Castle and starring Arthur Franz and Beverly Garland.

Plot
The docks of New Orleans, Louisiana are controlled by Zero Saxon, a notorious racketeer. When former naval officer Dan Corbett arrives in town, wanting to open a shipping business of his own, he accepts a job working for Saxon to make some money, unaware of how corrupt Saxon's operation is.

Longshoremen's union representative Jack Petty and his girlfriend Alma Mae are impressed by Dan when he flattens a drunk who has been annoying her. They help arrange a job for Dan through Saxon's dock manager, Joe Reilly, whose wife Marie then invites Dan to dinner and introduces him to her brother, Scrappy Durant, a former prizefighter.

Joe is killed by Saxon's thugs to keep him from informing on the illegal activities at the docks. Marie admits she has been expecting this to happen. Dan goes undercover, trying to help the New Orleans police investigate. Due to a misunderstanding, Scrappy attacks him in a boxing ring and Dan accidentally kills him with a punch. Dan is then beaten by Saxon's men, but with Alma and Marie's help, he is able to assist the police in placing Saxon under arrest.

Cast
 Arthur Franz as Dan Corbett
 Beverly Garland as Marie Reilly
 Helene Stanton as Alma Mae
 Michael Ansara as Zero Saxon
 Stacy Harris as Scrappy Durant
 Mike Mazurki as Big Mike
 William Henry as Joe Reilly
 Michael Granger as Jack Petty
 Frankie Ray as Deuce
 Ed Nelson as Charlie (as Edward Stafford Nelson)
 Al Chittenden as President, General Longshore Workers, Local 1418, ILA
 Joseph L. Scheuering as Superintendent of Police, City of New Orleans
 Victor Schiro as Senior Councilman, City of New Orleans 
 Howard L. Dey as Fire Chief, City of New Orleans
 Pete Herman as himself
 Ralph Dupas as himself
 Judge Walter B. Hamlin as Wayne Brandon

Reception 
The New York Times called it an "undistinguished" film with a "standard, banal story".

See also
List of American films of 1955

References

External links
 
 
 

1955 films
1955 crime films
American crime films
American black-and-white films
Films set in New Orleans
Columbia Pictures films
Films directed by William Castle
1950s English-language films
1950s American films